Sergio Ballesio (15 September 1934 – 16 March 2021) was an Italian field hockey player. He competed in the men's tournament at the 1960 Summer Olympics.

References

External links
 

1934 births
2021 deaths
Italian male field hockey players
Olympic field hockey players of Italy
Field hockey players at the 1960 Summer Olympics
Sportspeople from Rome